Forward Racing is a motorcycle racing team competing in the Moto2 World Championship.

History
The team started competing in the MotoGP class as the Hayate Racing Team, a scaled down version of the Kawasaki factory team that withdrew from MotoGP for the  championship due to the Great Recession. The team took its name from the Japanese word Hayate meaning hurricane. The team ran one Kawasaki ZX-RR motorcycle that was ridden by Marco Melandri.

Kawasaki stopped developing new parts for the motorbike in March 2009, meaning Kawasaki's involvement was limited to servicing and maintaining the motorcycle for the rest of the 2009 season. Despite this, Melandri achieved a remarkable result in coming second at the French Grand Prix at Le Mans in May.

In 2010, they participated as Forward Racing in the new Moto2 class, with Jules Cluzel and Claudio Corti as their riders on Suter bikes. Cluzel won the British Grand Prix and finished 7th in the championship. Corti had a pole position for the same race, but his best result was ninth at Misano. In 2011 the team competed with Cluzel and Alex Baldolini, later replaced by Raffaele De Rosa. The best result was a fourth place clinched by Cluzel at the British Grand Prix.

The team returned to MotoGP in 2012 as one of the Claiming Rule Teams and signed Colin Edwards, fielding a Suter chassis with a BMW engine.

For the 2012 Moto2 Championship Forward Racing signed Alex de Angelis and Yuki Takahashi. The team started the season with Suter bikes then switched to FTR after six rounds; with the new chassis de Angelis won the Malaysian Grand Prix.

For 2013, Forward Racing expanded its MotoGP involvement to a two-rider team, signing Claudio Corti alongside Colin Edwards with new FTR-Kawasaki bikes. The Moto2 effort was expanded to four riders with Simone Corsi, Mattia Pasini, Alex de Angelis and Ricard Cardús aboard Speed Up bikes.

In 2014 the team again entered the MotoGP class with two bikes for Colin Edwards and Aleix Espargaró. Taking advantage of the new Open category, Forward Racing intended to use Yamaha-leased YZR-M1 engines with FTR frames, however the team started the season with a complete Yamaha YZR-M1 engine-frame-swingarm package with other parts supplied by FTR. At the Mugello round Edwards debuted the new Forward frame built by Harris Performance. Espargaró, who stayed with the Yamaha frame, achieved a pole position at Assen and finished on the podium at Aragon with second place, finishing seventh in the championship.

In Moto2 Forward Racing stepped back to a two-rider team, retaining Pasini and Corsi. The team started the season with 2013-specification Kalex frames modified in-house and rebadged as Forward KLX. At the fifth round the team switched to official Kalex bikes. Riding the new frame Corsi scored two podiums, but a crash at Silverstone ended his season. He was then replaced by Supersport World Championship rider Florian Marino.

For the  season, Forward Racing renewed their partnership with Yamaha, planning to run two bikes with YZR-M1 engine-frame-swingarm packages and abandoning the in-house chassis project. New riders were Stefan Bradl and Loris Baz. Forward also renewed its commitment to the Moto2 class fielding two Kalex frames for Simone Corsi, returning from his injury, and new teammate Lorenzo Baldassarri.

Shortly after the German round, littles problems afflict the team that than announced that they had released Stefan Bradl from his contract at his request. The team returned on track at Brno in both the MotoGP and Moto2 classes with Bradl being replaced by Claudio Corti alongside Baz, Corsi and Baldassarri.

Results

Notes
* Season still in progress.

References

External links
 

Motorcycle racing teams
Motorcycle racing teams established in 2009
2009 establishments in Switzerland